Nancy Messonnier (née Rosenstein; born November 1965) is an American physician who served as the director of the National Center for Immunization and Respiratory Diseases at the Centers for Disease Control and Prevention from 2016 to 2021. She worked on the CDC's response to the COVID-19 pandemic in the United States.

Early life and education
Messonnier was born in Philadelphia, Pennsylvania, to Robert Rosenstein, who ran a small business, and Gerri Rosenstein, a bookkeeper and local school board president. She grew up in Lower Moreland Township, Pennsylvania, with her brother Rod Rosenstein.

Messonnier graduated from Lower Moreland High School in Lower Moreland Township. She received her Bachelor of Arts degree from the University of Pennsylvania in 1987. She then attended the University of Chicago School of Medicine, where she received her Doctor of Medicine in 1992. She then returned to the University of Pennsylvania for her residency training in internal medicine between 1992 and 1995.

Career

Messonnier began her career in public health in 1995 as an epidemic intelligence service officer in the National Center for Infectious Diseases, a program of the Centers for Disease Control and Prevention (CDC). During her tenure at the CDC, she led the Meningitis and Vaccine Preventable Diseases Branch in NCIRD's Division of Bacterial Diseases from 2007 to 2012. She also served as the deputy director of NCIRD from 2014 to 2016 before becoming director of the center on April 4, 2016.

During the course of her career, Messonnier notably worked on the 2001 anthrax attacks response, serving as co-leader of the anthrax management team and vaccine working group. She also played a leading role developing a low-cost meningococcal meningitis vaccine to prevent an emerging epidemic in Africa, known as MenAfriVac, in 2010. She has also worked on communications strategies to promote the use of vaccines to prevent the emergence of disease outbreaks.

COVID-19 pandemic in the United States 
Starting January 2020, Messonnier helped lead the CDC efforts to address and combat the emerging threat of COVID-19, the disease caused by the novel coronavirus (SARS-CoV-2). When 195 Americans were evacuated out of Wuhan because of the virus, the CDC moved to quarantine all of them, with Messonnier noting: "While we realize this is an unprecedented action, this is an unprecedented threat."

In a February 25 press briefing at the White House, Messonnier warned of the impending community spread of the virus in the United States, stating: "Disruption to everyday life might be severe." Following her comments during the February White House press briefing, she did not appear again at the briefing, and there was speculation that Messonnier had been "silenced" for her comments stressing the growing urgency of the COVID-19 pandemic in the United States. On February 28, she said that the U.S. "acted incredibly quickly before most other countries. Aggressively controlled our borders and we were able to slow the spread into the United States. ...We have been testing aggressively." While Messonnier no longer appeared in White House briefings, she continued giving regular CDC briefings, which were broadcast to the public, until April 2020, and she made public appearances in All Things Considered on NPR.

On March 9, 2020 she cautioned those who were at high risk of severe illness, including the elderly and people with pre-existing conditions, to take cautionary measures such as stocking up on groceries and medications, and preparing to shelter in place for the foreseeable future. She also addressed concerns around the CDC and FDA's failure to get working COVID-19 testing kits into the hands of public health officials in a timely manner to enable better containment of the disease and mitigation of its spread. On January 21, 2020, she announced that the CDC had finalized its own COVID-19 test. On February 5, the CDC began distributing diagnostic tests to public-health laboratories; however, several of those tests had contaminated reagents, rendering them useless, and leading to a major gap in fighting the outbreak. The situation was exacerbated by FDA-imposed regulations on testing, making it difficult for independent development of COVID-19 tests to fill the CDC's distribution gap.

On May 7, 2021 she told colleagues she was resigning from the CDC effective May 14, saying "now is the best time for me to transition to a new phase of my career." She said she would become executive director for pandemic and public health systems at the Skoll Foundation, based in Palo Alto, California. On June 22, 2022 the UNC Gillings School of Global Public Health at the University of North Carolina at Chapel Hill announced that Messonnier had been appointed to serve as the school’s dean following the departure of Barbara Rimer, effective September 1, 2022.

Personal life 
Messonnier is married to Mark L. Messonnier. She is the sister of Rod Rosenstein.

Awards, honors, and decorations 
 2000: Centers for Disease Control and Prevention, Iain C. Hardy Memorial Award
 2011: Philip Horne Award, National Center for Immunization and Respiratory Diseases

United States Public Health Service Commissioned Corps

Selected works and publications

References

External links

 Nancy Messonnier at the Center for the National Center for Immunization and Respiratory Diseases (NCIRD) at the CDC

1965 births
Centers for Disease Control and Prevention people
Living people
Pritzker School of Medicine alumni
United States Public Health Service Commissioned Corps officers
University of Pennsylvania alumni
American women physicians
21st-century American Jews
21st-century American women
Members of the National Academy of Medicine